Sajjadul Haque (born 10 January 1990) is a cricketer from Bangladesh.  He made his debut for Chittagong Division in 2006/07, scoring 38 in a losing cause against Barisal Division. He made his Twenty20 debut for Gazi Group Cricketers in the 2018–19 Dhaka Premier Division Twenty20 Cricket League on 26 February 2019.

References

1990 births
Bangladeshi cricketers
Chittagong Division cricketers
Living people
Legends of Rupganj cricketers
Gazi Group cricketers